These Helen Hayes Awards are given for outstanding acting in non-resident or touring productions that are staged in the Washington, DC metropolitan area.

Lead acting

Outstanding Lead Actor in a Touring Production
 1985 Derek Jacobi - Cyrano de Bergerac - The Kennedy Center
 Charles Adler - Torch Song Trilogy - The Warner Theatre
 James Whitmore - Will Rogers, U.S.A. - Ford's Theatre
 Joe Sears - Greater Tuna - Ford's Theatre
 Mbongeni Ngema - Woza, Albert! - Arena Stage
 Percy Mtwa - Woza, Albert! - Arena Stage

Outstanding Lead Actor in a Touring Production or Prior to New York
 1986 Jason Robards - The Iceman Cometh - American National Theatre
 Bill Irwin - The Regard of Flight - Arena Stage
 Keene Curtis - La Cage aux Folles - The National Theatre
 Patrick Dempsey - Brighton Beach Memoirs - The National Theatre
 Tommy Tune - My One and Only - The Kennedy Center
 William L. Petersen - In the Belly of the Beast: Letters From Prison - American National Theatre

Outstanding Lead Actor in a Non-Resident Production
 1987 Colm Wilkinson - Les Misérables - The Kennedy Center
 Ben Cross - The Caine Mutiny Court Martial - The Kennedy Center
 Delroy Lindo - A Raisin in the Sun - The Kennedy Center
 Edward Duke - Jeeves Takes Charge - Ford's Theatre
 Joe Sears - Greater Tuna - Ford's Theatre
 Jonathan Silverman - Broadway Bound - The National Theatre
 1988 Derek Jacobi - Breaking the Code - The Kennedy Center
 Ian McKellen - Acting Shakespeare - The National Theatre
 Joel Grey - Cabaret - The Kennedy Center
 Judd Hirsch - I'm Not Rappaport - The National Theatre
 Richard Kiley - All My Sons - Ford's Theatre
 Shay Duffin - Confessions of an Irish Rebel - New Playwrights' Theatre
 1989 Victor Garber - Wenceslas Square - The Kennedy Center
 B.D. Wong - M. Butterfly - The National Theatre
 Brock Peters - Driving Miss Daisy - The Kennedy Center
 John Lithgow - M. Butterfly - The National Theatre
 Sammy Cahn - Words and Music - Ford's Theatre
 Tim Curry - Me and My Girl - The National Theatre
 1990 Charles S. Dutton - The Piano Lesson - The Kennedy Center
 Avery Brooks - Paul Robeson - The Kennedy Center
 David Hurst - Incommunicado - The Kennedy Center
 Jaston Williams - A Tuna Christmas - The Kennedy Center
 Joe Sears - A Tuna Christmas - The Kennedy Center
 Tom Hulce - A Few Good Men - The Kennedy Center
 1991 J. Mark McVey - Les Mis rables - The National Theatre
 Christopher Moore - The Video Store Owner's Significant Other - American Playwrights Theatre
 E.G. Marshall - Love Letters - The National Theatre
 Frank McCusker - The Playboy of the Western World - The Kennedy Center
 Michael Waldron - Lend Me a Tenor - The Kennedy Center
 1992 Robert Morse - Tru - The Kennedy Center
 Harry Groener - Crazy for You - The National Theatre
 Jr.,John Cothran - Two Trains Running - The Kennedy Center
 Niall Buggy - The Shadow of a Gunman - The Kennedy Center
 1993 Ian McKellen - Richard III - The Kennedy Center
 Chip Esten - Buddy: The Buddy Holly Story - The Kennedy Center
 Jonathan Earl Peck - Blood Knot - Arena Stage
 Stacy Keach - Solitary Confinement - The Kennedy Center
 Thomas W. Jones II - The Wizard of Hip (or When in Doubt Slam Dunk) - The Studio Theatre
 1994 Stacy Keach - The Kentucky Cycle - The Kennedy Center
 Joel Blum - The World Goes 'Round - The Kennedy Center
 Lewis J. Stadlen - Guys and Dolls - The Kennedy Center
 Ron Rifkin - 3 Hotels - The Kennedy Center
 William H. Macy - Oleanna - The Kennedy Center
 1995 Raul Aranas - Miss Saigon - The Kennedy Center
 Charles Cioffi - The Sisters Rosensweig - The Kennedy Center
 Jaston Williams - The Foreigner - Ford's Theatre
 Joe Sears - The Foreigner - Ford's Theatre
 Steve Isaacs - The Who's Tommy - The Kennedy Center
 1996 Jonathan Hadary - Angels in America, Part 1: Millennium Approaches - The Kennedy Center
 Colm Wilkinson - "Andrew Lloyd Webber Music of the Night" - The National Theatre
 Jonathan Hadary - Angels in America, Part 2: Perestroika - The Kennedy Center
 Juan Chioran - Kiss of the Spider Woman, The Musical - The National Theatre
 Kirby Ward - Crazy for You - The Kennedy Center
 Matthew Broderick - How to Succeed in Business Without Really Trying! - The Kennedy Center
 1997 Roger Guenveur Smith - A Huey P. Newton Story - Woolly Mammoth Theatre Company
 Alex Jennings - A Midsummer Night's Dream - The Kennedy Center
 Bruce McIntosh - Fixin' to Die: A Visit to the Mind of Lee Atwater - Church Street Theater
 Frederick C. Inkley - Disney's Beauty and the Beast - The Kennedy Center
 Jerry Lewis - Damn Yankees - The Kennedy Center
 Ntare Mwine - Nomathemba - The Kennedy Center
 1998 Derick K. Grant - Bring in 'da Noise, Bring in 'da Funk - The National Theatre
 Ezra Knight - The Darker Face of the Earth - The Kennedy Center and Crossroads Theatre Company
 Gregory Henderson - Whirlwind! - Turnip Theatre Company and Jay Harris at Church Street Theater
 Jaston Williams - A Tuna Christmas - The Warner Theatre
 Joe Sears - A Tuna Christmas - The Warner Theatre
 John Scherer - By Jeeves - The Kennedy Center and the Goodspeed Opera House
 1999 Alex Jennings - Hamlet - The Kennedy Center
 Alton Fitzgerald White - Ragtime - The National Theatre
 Dan Hiatt - Picasso at the Lapin Agile - Ford's Theatre
 Jeremy Kushnier - Footloose - The Kennedy Center
 Michael Rupert - Ragtime - The National Theatre
 2000 Norbert Leo Butz - Cabaret - The Warner Theatre
 Bill Irwin - Fool Moon - The Kennedy Center
 Charles Durning - The Gin Game - The Kennedy Center
 David Shiner - Fool Moon - The Kennedy Center
 Jaston Williams - Red, White and Tuna - The Kennedy Center
 Joe Sears - Red, White and Tuna - The Kennedy Center
 2001 Marc Wolf - Another American: Asking and Telling - The Studio Theatre
 Jack Willis - Art - The Kennedy Center
 Little John Nee - The Derry Boat - The Keegan Theatre
 Stephen Bogardus - James Joyce's The Dead - The Kennedy Center
 Terace Jones - Fosse - The National Theatre
 Tyler Perry - I Can Do Bad All By Myself - The Warner Theatre
 2002 Jason Watkins - A Servant of Two Masters - John F. Kennedy Center
 Brian Stokes Mitchell - King Hedley II - John F. Kennedy Center
 Ethan Sandler - Fully Committed - Ford's Theatre
 Matt Rippy - The Compleat Works of Wm. Shakespeare (Abridged) - John F. Kennedy Center
 Ron Campbell - The Thousandth Night - MetroStage
 2003 Brian Stokes Mitchell - Man of La Mancha - The National Theatre
 John Epperson - Lypsinka! The Boxed Set - The Studio Theatre
 Judd Hirsch - I'm not Rappaport - Ford's Theatre
 Justin Bond - Kiki & Herb in Pardon Our Appearance - Woolly Mammoth Theatre Company
 Len Cariou - Copenhagen - The Kennedy Center

Outstanding Lead Actress in a Touring Production
 1985 Diane Fratantoni - Cats - The National Theatre
 Kaye Ballard - Hey, Ma ... Kaye Ballard - The Kennedy Center
 Lenka Peterson - Quilters - The Kennedy Center
 Sally Struthers - The Odd Couple - The National Theatre
 Sinéad Cusack - Cyrano de Bergerac - The Kennedy Center

Outstanding Lead Actress in a Touring Production or Prior to New York
 1986 Barbara E. Robertson - Kabuki Medea - American National Theatre
 Barbara Cook - Barbara Cook—A Broadway Evening - Ford's Theatre
 Laurie Metcalf - Coyote Ugly - American National Theatre
 Sandy Duncan - My One and Only - The Kennedy Center
 Zoe Caldwell - Lillian - The Kennedy Center

Outstanding Lead Actress in a Non-Resident Production
 1987 Linda Lavin - Broadway Bound - The National Theatre
 Esther Rolle - A Raisin in the Sun - The Kennedy Center
 Rosemary Harris - Hay Fever - The Kennedy Center
 Sharon Brown - Dreamgirls - The National Theatre
 Teresa Burrell - Queenie Pie - The Kennedy Center
 1988 Ann Guilbert - The Immigrant: A Hamilton County Album - Arena Stage
 Alyson Reed - Cabaret - The Kennedy Center
 Colleen Dewhurst - My Gene - The Kennedy Center
 Donna McKechnie - Sweet Charity - The National Theatre
 Sandra Reaves-Phillips - The Great Ladies of Blues & Jazz - Arena Stage
 1989 Lily Tomlin - The Search for Signs of Intelligent Life in the Universe - The Kennedy Center
 Dana Ivey - Wenceslas Square - The Kennedy Center
 Julie Harris - Driving Miss Daisy - The Kennedy Center
 Madeline Kahn - Born Yesterday - The National Theatre
 Tina Fabrique - Abyssinia - Arena Stage
 1990 Nan Martin - The Road to Mecca - The Kennedy Center
 Margo Martindale - Steel Magnolias - The Kennedy Center
 Nancy Marchand - The Cocktail Hour - The Kennedy Center
 S. Epatha Merkerson - The Piano Lesson - The Kennedy Center
 Tyne Daly - Gypsy - The Kennedy Center
 1991 Cheryl Lynn Bruce - From the Mississippi Delta - Arena Stage
 Colleen Dewhurst - Love Letters - The National Theatre
 Jacqueline Williams - From the Mississippi Delta - Arena Stage
 Roma Downey - The Playboy of the Western World - The Kennedy Center
 Sally Mayes - Closer Than Ever - Arena Stage
 Sybil Walker - From the Mississippi Delta - Arena Stage
 1992 Mercedes Ruehl - Lost in Yonkers - The National Theatre
 Cynthia Martells - Two Trains Running - The Kennedy Center
 Jodi Benson - Crazy for You - The National Theatre
 Julie Harris - Lucifer's Child - The Kennedy Center
 Teri Bibb - The Phantom of the Opera - The Kennedy Center
 1993 Julie Harris - Lettice & Lovage - The National Theatre
 Charlotte Cornwell - Richard III - The Kennedy Center
 Linda Balgord - Aspects of Love - The Kennedy Center
 Melody Kay - The Secret Garden - The Kennedy Center
 Roberta Maxwell - Lettice & Lovage - The National Theatre
 Vanita Harbour - Once on This Island - The Kennedy Center
 1994 Debra Monk - 3 Hotels - The Kennedy Center
 Lorna Luft - Guys and Dolls - The Kennedy Center
 Marlo Thomas - Six Degrees of Separation - The National Theatre
 Melissa Errico - My Fair Lady - The National Theatre
 Valerie Wright - The World Goes 'Round - The Kennedy Center
 1995 Eileen Atkins - A Room of One's Own - Arena Stage
 Caroline Aaron - The Sisters Rosensweig - The Kennedy Center
 Jennifer C. Paz - Miss Saigon - The Kennedy Center
 Lynn Redgrave - Shakespeare for My Father - Ford's Theatre
 Suzanne Burden - The Winter's Tale - The Kennedy Center
 1996 Zoe Caldwell - Master Class - The Kennedy Center
 Beverly Ward - Crazy for You - The Kennedy Center
 Carol Channing - Hello, Dolly! - The Kennedy Center
 Chita Rivera - Kiss of the Spider Woman, The Musical - The National Theatre
 Marian Seldes - Three Tall Women - The Kennedy Center
 1997 Lizan Mitchell - Having Our Say - The Kennedy Center
 Micki Grant - Having Our Say - The Kennedy Center
 Cee-Cee Harshaw - Nomathemba - The Kennedy Center
 Irene Molloy - Whistle Down the Wind - The National Theatre
 Uta Hagen - Mrs. Klein - The Kennedy Center
 Valerie Wright - Damn Yankees - The Kennedy Center
 1998 Anna Deavere Smith - Twilight: Los Angeles, 1992 - Ford's Theatre
 Simone - Rent - The National Theatre
 Belle Calaway - Chicago - The National Theatre
 Jasmine Guy - Chicago - The National Theatre
 LisaGay Hamilton - Valley Song - The Kennedy Center and the Mark Taper Forum
 1999 Jane Lapotaire - All is True, or, the Famous History of the Life of King Henry VIII - The Kennedy Center
 B.J. Crosby - Dreamgirls - The Kennedy Center
 Darlesia Cearcy - Ragtime - The National Theatre
 Joanne Pearce - Cymbeline - The Kennedy Center
 Rebecca Eichenberger - Ragtime - The National Theatre
 2000 Angelica Torn - Side Man - The Kennedy Center
 Bernadette Peters - Annie Get Your Gun - The Kennedy Center
 Erin Dilly - Martin Guerre - The Kennedy Center
 Julie Harris - The Gin Game - The Kennedy Center
 Teri Hatcher - Cabaret - The Warner Theatre
 2001 Judith Light - Wit - The Kennedy Center
 Eloise Laws - It Ain't Nothin' But the Blues - The Kennedy Center
 Faith Prince - James Joyce's The Dead - The Kennedy Center
 Gretha Boston - It Ain't Nothin' But the Blues - The Kennedy Center
 Reva Rice - Fosse - The National Theatre
 2002 Jodi Capeless - Late Nite Catechism - Phoenix Productions
 Anna Friel - Lulu - John F. Kennedy Center
 Claudia Shear - dirty BLONDE - John F. Kennedy Center
 Pauline Turner - Mill on the Floss - John F. Kennedy Center
 Rachel York - Kiss Me, Kate - John F. Kennedy Center
 2003 Sarah Jones - Surface Transit - Woolly Mammoth Theatre Company
 Alice Ripley - Tell Me on a Sunday - The Kennedy Center
 Barbara Cook - Mostly Sondheim - The Kennedy Center
 Mariette Hartley - Copenhagen - The Kennedy Center
 Paulette Ivory - Aida - The Kennedy Center

Supporting acting

Outstanding Supporting Performer in a Touring Production
 1985 Estelle Getty - Torch Song Trilogy - The Warner Theatre
 Clarence Fountain - The Gospel at Colonus - Arena Stage
 Frank Olivier - Sugar Babies - The Warner Theatre
 Pete Postlethwaite - Cyrano de Bergerac - The Kennedy Center
 Sal Mistretta - Cats - The National Theatre

Outstanding Supporting Performer in a Touring Production or Prior to New York
 1986 Barnard Hughes - The Iceman Cometh - American National Theatre
 Charles "Honi" Coles - My One and Only - The Kennedy Center
 Donald Moffat - The Iceman Cometh - American National Theatre
 Larry Larson - Tent Meeting - The Kennedy Center
 Lisa Waltz - Brighton Beach Memoirs - The National Theatre

Outstanding Supporting Actor in a Non-Resident Production
 1990 Stephen Lang - A Few Good Men - The Kennedy Center
 Carole Cook - Steel Magnolias - The Kennedy Center
 Holland Taylor - The Cocktail Hour - The Kennedy Center
 Kandis Chappell - Rumors - The National Theatre
 Rocky Carroll - The Piano Lesson - The Kennedy Center
 Tracy Katz - Into the Woods - The Kennedy Center

Outstanding Supporting Performer in a Non-Resident Production
 1987 Frances Ruffelle - Les Mis rables - The Kennedy Center
 Andrew Polk - Biloxi Blues - The National Theatre
 Jason Alexander - Broadway Bound - The National Theatre
 Martine Allard - The Tap Dance Kid - The Warner Theatre
 Randy Graff - Les Mis rables - The Kennedy Center
 1988 Jamey Sheridan - All My Sons - Ford's Theatre
 Ed Hall - Joe Turner's Come and Gone - Arena Stage
 Michael Gough - Breaking the Code - The Kennedy Center
 Regina Resnik - Cabaret - The Kennedy Center
 Richard McMillan - The Mikado - The Kennedy Center
 1989 Bruce Norris - Wenceslas Square - The Kennedy Center
 Erick Devine - Me and My Girl - The National Theatre
 Fannie Green - Abyssinia - Arena Stage
 Queen Esther Marrow - Harlem Suite - The Warner Theatre
 Stephen Root - Driving Miss Daisy - The Kennedy Center
 1991 Mark Baker - Grand Hotel: The Musical - The Kennedy Center
 David Kelly - The Playboy of the Western World - The Kennedy Center
 Drew Eshelman - Les Mis rables - The National Theatre
 Letta Mbulu - Sheila's Day - Ford's Theatre
 Ron Holgate - Lend Me a Tenor - The Kennedy Center
 Susan Tilson - Les Mis rables - The National Theatre
 1992 Roscoe Lee Browne - Two Trains Running - The Kennedy Center
 Irene Worth - Lost in Yonkers - The National Theatre
 Mark Harelick - The Heidi Chronicles - The Kennedy Center
 Pauline Flanagan - The Shadow of a Gunman - The Kennedy Center
 Rainn Wilson - Two Gentlemen of Verona - Arena Stage
 Robert Curtis Brown - The Heidi Chronicles - The Kennedy Center
 1994 Jacob (Tuck) Milligan - The Kentucky Cycle - The Kennedy Center
 Jeanne Paulsen - The Kentucky Cycle - The Kennedy Center
 Lillian Garrett-Groag - The Kentucky Cycle - The Kennedy Center
 Paxton Whitehead - My Fair Lady - The National Theatre
 1997 Desmond Barrit - A Midsummer Night's Dream - The Kennedy Center
 Andrea McArdle - State Fair - The Kennedy Center
 Joseph Shabalala - Nomathemba - The Kennedy Center
 Laila Robins - Mrs. Klein - The Kennedy Center
 Scott Wise - State Fair - The Kennedy Center
 1998 L. Scott Caldwell - Proposals - The Kennedy Center
 Obba Babatund - Chicago - The National Theatre
 Stephan Alexander - Rent - The National Theatre
 Trazana Beverley - The Darker Face of the Earth - The Kennedy Center and Crossroads Theatre Company
 Tsai Chin - Golden Child - The Kennedy Center
 1999 Guy Henry - Cymbeline - The Kennedy Center
 David Ryall - Hamlet - The Kennedy Center
 Derbhle Crotty - Hamlet - The Kennedy Center
 Tom Plotkin - Footloose - The Kennedy Center
 Tony Todd - The Captain's Tiger - The Kennedy Center
 2000 Dick Latessa - Cabaret - The Warner Theatre
 Anthony Evans - Inspiration - Ford's Theatre
 Marcus Chait - Titanic: A New Musical - The Kennedy Center
 Michael Arnold - Martin Guerre - The Kennedy Center
 Michael Mastro - Side Man - The Kennedy Center
 2001 Alice Cannon - James Joyce's The Dead - The Kennedy Center
 "Mississippi" Charles Bevel - It Ain't Nothin' But the Blues - The Kennedy Center
 Len Cariou - The Dinner Party - The Kennedy Center
 Penny Fuller - The Dinner Party - The Kennedy Center
 Sean McCourt - It Ain't Nothin' But the Blues - The Kennedy Center
 2002 Tom Riis Farrell - dirty BLONDE - John F. Kennedy Center
 Charles Brown - King Hedley II - John F. Kennedy Center
 Michael Matus - Mill on the Floss - John F. Kennedy Center
 Nancy Anderson - Kiss Me, Kate - John F. Kennedy Center
 Stephen McKinley Henderson - King Hedley II - John F. Kennedy Center
 2003 Kelli Fournier - Aida - The Kennedy Center
 Carol Woods - The Full Monty - The National Theatre
 Cleavant Derricks - The Full Monty - The National Theatre
 Kenny Mellman - Kiki & Herb in Pardon Our Appearance - Woolly Mammoth Theatre Company
 Mary Ellen Mahoney - Mamma Mia! - The National Theatre

See also
Helen Hayes Awards Non-Resident Production
Helen Hayes Awards Resident Acting
Helen Hayes Awards Resident Design
Helen Hayes Awards Resident Production

Sources

Theatre acting awards
Helen Hayes Awards